Alfredo Giop de Palchi (born December 13, 1926 Verona, Italy – August 6, 2020) was an Italian poet and translator.

Life
He grew up in Legnago, Verona, Italy. He was a political prisoner from the Spring of 1945 until the Spring of 1951. From 1951 to 1956 he lived in Paris, France and in Spain. In 1952 he married Sonia Raiziss, and with her, edited Chelsea magazine from 1960 on. On October 12, 1956, he arrived in New York City. He was trustee of the Sonia Raiziss Giop Charitable Foundation. He was a judge for the Raiziss/de Palchi Translation Awards. He lived in Union Square, New York City with his wife Rita and daughter Luce. He was the publisher of the non-profit Chelsea Editions. A lecture series was named for him at the University of Hartford.

Works

Poetry

English Bibliography

Italian Bibliography

Editor

Bibliography 
 A Life Gambled in Poetry. Homage to Alfredo de Palchi, Edited by Luigi Fontanella, Stony Brook, New York: Gradiva Publications, 2011. Contributions by: S. Aglieco, D. Bisutti, L. Bonaffini, B. Carle, N. Condini, M. De Angelis, G. Fantato, A. Ferramosca, G. Ferri, L. Fontanella, D. Gioseffi, K. Kvitko, A. Macchia, V. Magrelli, G. Malanga, L. Manzi, I. Marchegiani, S. Montalto, M. Moroni, M. Palma, G. Panella, P. Perilli, S. Ramat, V. Surliuga, A.J. Tamburri, J. Taylor, P. Valduga, P. Valesio, A. Zagaroli. 
 The Poetry of Alfredo De Palchi. An Interview and Three Essays by Giuseppe Panella (translated from the Italian by James Alden), New York, Chelsea Editions, 2013.

References

External links
 
 "Alfredo de Palchi", Daniela Gioseffi, Italian American Writers
 Le Viziose Avversioni Tiziano Thomas Dossena, L'Idea Magazine #74 Vol.I, NY, 1999
 Scritti sulla poesia di De Palchi  Tiziano Thomas Dossena, L'Idea Magazine #15 Vol.II, NY 2002
 Alfredo de Palchi and Sona Raiziss Papers. General Collection, Beinecke Rare Book and Manuscript Library, Yale University.

1926 births
American male poets
American poets
Writers from Verona
American translators
Italian poets
Italian emigrants to the United States
2020 deaths